Aquae Novae in Numidia is a former Roman city and bishopric and is presently a Latin Catholic titular see.

History 
Aquae Novae was an Ancient city in present Algeria, which was important enough to become a suffragan bishopric in the Roman province of Numidia, but faded.

Titular see 
The diocese was nominally restored in 1933 as a titular bishopric.

It has had the following incumbents, all of the lowest (episcopal) rank :
 Douglas Joseph Warren (1964.06.16 – 1967.09.26), as Auxiliary Bishop of Wilcannia–Forbes (Australia) (1964.06.16 – 1967.09.26), later succeeded as Bishop of Wilcannia-Forbes (1967.09.26 – 1994.03.30)
 Samuel Silverio Buitrago Trujillo, Lazarists (C.M.) (1968.10.11 – 1972.12.18), Auxiliary Bishop of Manizales (Colombia) (1968.10.11 – 1972.12.18), later Bishop of Montería (Colombia) (1972.12.18 – 1976.10.11), finally Metropolitan Archbishop of Popayán (Colombia) (1976.10.11 – 1990.04.11)
 Tito Solari Capellari, Salesians (S.D.B.) (1986.12.16 – 1998.03.07), Auxiliary Bishop of Santa Cruz de la Sierra (Bolivia) (1986.12.16 – 1998.03.07), Coadjutor Archbishop of Cochabamba (Bolivia) (1998.03.07 – 1999.07.08), succeeding as Metropolitan Archbishop of Cochabamba (1999.07.08 – 2014.09.24)
 Albano Bortoletto Cavallin (1973.06.14 – 1986.10.24), Auxiliary Bishop of Curitiba (Brazil) (1973.06.14 – 1986.10.24), Bishop of Guarapuava (Brazil) (1986.10.24 – 1992.03.11), Metropolitan Archbishop of Londrina (Brazil) (1992.03.11 – 2006.05.10)
 Francisco Javier Múnera Correa, Consolata Missionaries (I.M.C.) (1998.11.28 – ...), Apostolic Vicar of San Vicente del Caguán (Colombia).

See also 
 Aquae in Numidia
 Aquae Novae in Proconsulari

Source and External links 
 GigaCatholic with titular incumbent links

Catholic titular sees in Africa